Hypena scabra, the green cloverworm or black snout, is a moth of the family Erebidae. The species was first described by Johan Christian Fabricius in 1798. It is found in North America from Canada south to Florida and Texas. It has also been reported from Great Britain.

The wingspan is 25–35 mm. Adults are on wing from March to November or all year round in warmer regions. There are multiple generations per year.

The larvae feed on low-growing legumes, including alfalfa, bean, clover, pea and soybean. They also feed on woody legumes such as false indigo and locust. Other reported hosts include birch, cherry, corn, elm, hackberry, New Jersey tea, poplar, ragweed, sida, strawberry and willow.

References

External links

Roberts, Phillip & Guillebeau, Paul (October 8, 2008). "Hypena scabra". BugwoodWiki. Retrieved February 12, 2020.

scabra
Moths of North America
Moths described in 1798